Maryanne C. Petrilla is the former Luzerne County Commissioner Chairperson, before the county adopted a Home Rule Charter in 2012. As of 2011, she resided in Sugarloaf Township, Pennsylvania.  She is the second female Commissioner Chairperson in the county's history after Rose Tucker. Petrilla is a graduate of the McCann School of Business and Technology.

Notes 

Living people
Pennsylvania Democrats
Year of birth missing (living people)
Luzerne County Councilmembers (Pennsylvania)